The 2010–11 Boston Blades season was the first in Boston Blades history. The Blades competed in the Canadian Women's Hockey League and attempted to win the Clarkson Cup.

Background
On August 12, 2010, the CWHL announced that the city of Boston would receive an expansion team for the 2010–11 CWHL season. The unnamed team will practice at Ristuccia Arena in Wilmington.

Offseason
September 17: Former New Hampshire goaltender Erin Whitten was named head coach of the Boston expansion franchise.
September 27: Mariel Lacina was appointed as Assistant Coach. Prior to coaching, she was a goaltender for the Dartmouth Big Green women's ice hockey program.

CWHL Draft
The Boston club was able to protect some players from being selected from their roster in the 2010 CWHL Draft.

Protected players

Free agents

Protected players

Regular season
December 19: The Blades came from behind to defeat Montreal. In doing so, they broke up Montreal's bid for an undefeated season.  Boston goalie Mandy Cronin stopped 74 shots to lead Boston to victory. Montreal had an early 2-0 lead. In the 2nd period, Blades player Sam Faber scored on an assist by Jess Koizumi. In the third period, Koizumi would tie the game. With 3:24 to play in the game, Angela Ruggiero scored the game-winning goal. She was assisted by Sam Faber and Hayley Moore.
January 16: Gillian Apps scored her seventh goal of the season 2:42 into overtime as Brampton defeated the Boston Blades by a 4-3 tally. The win was the fifth in a row for Brampton who are now 11-6 on the season. The five game win streak is currently the best in the league. Brampton has yet to lose a game in 2011. In addition, they have outscored their opponents 23-9 during the streak.
February 5 & 6:  a gallery of Toronto vs Boston games.
February 11:Boston are a blast.
February 12: Brampton tops Boston for tenth straight victory.
February 13: Cherie Piper hat trick contributes to a Brampton season sweep over Boston.
March 3: Boston Blades Team Up for Alzheimer Research: The Blades will be promoting at their games and hosting sign-up tables for those interested in riding, including at upcoming playoffs set for March 11–13.

Schedule

Standings 
Note: GP = Games played, W = Wins, L = Losses, T = Ties, OTL = Overtime losses, GF = Goals for, GA = Goals against, Pts = Points.

Attendance at Ristuccia Arena in Wilmington
total:	 3471 supporters for 16  games, average: 216 supporters by game at domicile.

Roster

Coaching staff
    Head Coach: Erin Whitten-Hamlen
    Assistant Coach: Mariel Lachina
    General Manager: Paul Hendrickson

Postseason
Boston is eliminated and cannot participate in the Clarkson Cup Championship.

See also
 2010–11 CWHL season
 2011 Clarkson Cup
 Boston Blades
 Canadian Women's Hockey League

References

External links
 web site
 facebook of Boston CWHL
  Boston CWHL on Twitter
 Live the dream Boston Blades  in Women Hockey Life, November 10, 2010.
  Video:Boston Blades: the 1st Boston Professional Women's Hockey Team

Boston
Boston Blades
Boston Blades